Kopernikus (sub. Rituel de mort; translated as Ritual of Death) is a 1979 opera in two acts by Canadian composer Claude Vivier, inspired by the astronomer of the same name. It is the only opera of three that Vivier completed prior to his death in 1983. A typical performance lasts around seventy minutes.

History
The opera was completed on 14 May 1979, and first premiered only in its musical form on 8 May 1980 at the Théâtre du Monument National in Montréal, under the conductor Lorraine Vaillancourt. Vivier dedicated the piece to his "maître and friend" Gilles Tremblay, whom he had studied composition with for four years.

Composition

Analysis
The libretto of Kopernikus, written entirely by Vivier, is composed of sections in German, French, and Vivier's langue inventées — an example of his preoccupation with linguistics and musical multilingualism.

Program notes

The notes given by Vivier in the finished manuscript, with English translation below:
Le personnage central est Agni; autour d’elle gravitent des êtres mythiques (représentés par les six autres chanteurs) tirés de l'histoire: Lewis Carroll, Merlin, une sorcière, la Reine de la nuit, un aveugle prophète, un vieux moine, Tristan et Isolde, Mozart, le Maître des eaux, Copernic et sa mère. Ces personnages sont peut-être les rêves d'Agni qui l'accompagnent dans son initiation et finalement dans sa dématérialisation.The main character is Agni; mystical beings borrowed from stories (represented by the other six singers) gravitate around her: Lewis Carroll, Merlin, a witch, the Queen of the Night, a blind prophet, an old monk, Tristan and Isolde, Mozart, the Master of the Waters, Copernicus and his mother. These characters could be Agni's dreams that follow her during her initiation and finally into her dematerialization.

Instrumentation
The opera is in a smaller scale compared to other classical operas. It is scored for seven vocalists who double as percussionists (similar to the chamber compositions of George Crumb), and pre-recorded tape.

Percussion
Balinese gong
3 Japanese gongs
Large tam-tam
Tubular bells
Bass drum
Magnetic tape
Crotales
Antique cymbals
Glockenspiel
Tape
Voice
2 Sopranos
Mezzosoprano
Contralto
Tenor
Baritone
Bass

Synopsis and structure

References

Citations

Sources

Further reading

 
 Bisson, Sophie (2019). "Claude Vivier’s Kopernikus: An Extramusical Postmortem". The WholeNote. Retrieved 2 August 2022.
 Bonfield, Stephan (2017). "Review: Vivier's Kopernikus at Banff Centre the ideal opera of the future". Calgary Herald. Retrieved 25 July 2022.
 Bratishenko, Lev (2017). "SCRUTINY | Kopernikus Heralds Opera In The 21st Century" Ludwig Van Toronto. Retrieved 6 August 2022.
 
 Potvin, Gilles (1980). "Kopernikus: un coup d’audace de Claude Vivier." Le Devoir.
 Simeonov, Jenna (2019). "Against the Grain Theatre’s production of Kopernikus is a true operatic ritual". The Globe and Mail. Retrieved 6 August 2022.

1979 compositions
Compositions by Claude Vivier
Compositions that use extended techniques
Electronic compositions
French-language operas
German-language operas